St. Joseph's Hospital is a psychiatric hospital in Limerick, County Limerick, Ireland.

History
The hospital, which was designed by Francis Johnston and William Murphy, opened as the Limerick Asylum in January 1827. It became Limerick Mental Hospital in the 1920s and went on to become St. Joseph's Hospital in the 1950s. After the introduction of deinstitutionalisation in the late 1980s the hospital went into a period of decline. However, despite calls for its closure, the hospital continues to offer rehabilitation services.

References

Hospitals in County Limerick
Fintans
Hospital buildings completed in 1827
1827 establishments in Ireland
Hospitals established in 1827
Health Service Executive hospitals